State Route 220 (SR 220) is a state highway located in central coastal Maine. SR 220 runs through a series of small towns, with connecting routes leading to larger population centers such as Augusta, Waterville, and Bangor to the east and west.

Route description 
SR 220 begins in Friendship at SR 97 (Shipyard Road) and Harbor Road, near the southern tip of the mainland at Friendship Harbor.  This intersection is also the southern terminus of SR 97.  SR 220 proceeds north along the western coast until reaching the town of Waldoboro in Lincoln County, where it enters the town center before turning northeast and crossing US 1.  Continuing north, SR 220 enters the town of Washington (re-entering Knox County) and intersects with SR 126 and SR 17 before reaching the center of town.  In downtown Washington, SR 105 joins SR 220 and the two routes head north out of town.

The highways cross into the town of Liberty in Waldo County, where SR 105 splits off to the southeast after a  concurrency. SR 220 continues northeast until meeting SR 173 near Saint George Lake, then turns northwest to cross SR 3 at Clark's Corner. The highway continues north through the town of Montville, crosses SR 137 in western Knox, and intersects with SR 139 in western Thorndike. SR 139 and SR 220 are cosigned for  into the town of Unity, where SR 139 splits off just east of the town center. The road enters the town of Troy and SR 220 splits off to the north, turning briefly east before returning to a northerly heading.  

SR 220 enters the town of Detroit in Somerset County and has a brief  with SR 69 in the downtown area, splitting just after crossing the East Branch Sebasticook River.  SR 220 continues northwest, crosses into the town of Palmyra and immediately terminates at SR 11 / SR 100 (Hurd's Corner).

History 
As originally designated in 1929, SR 220 ran from US 1 in Warren southwest to Friendship, then turned north and followed its modern routing as far as SR 139 in Thorndike.

The southernmost portion of the route between Warren and Waldoboro formed a "V" shape, and was potentially confusing in that a motorist traveling north on SR 220 from Warren to Friendship was actually driving southwest, and vice versa.  This was remedied in 1949 when SR 220 was truncated to Friendship at the southern tip of the "V," cutting  from its length.  The eastern leg of the "V" was redesignated as SR 97 and directional banners changed to reflect the actual direction of travel.  The alignment of SR 220 has not changed since.

Major junctions

References

External links

Floodgap Roadgap's RoadsAroundME: Maine State Route 220

220
Transportation in Knox County, Maine
Transportation in Lincoln County, Maine
Transportation in Waldo County, Maine
Transportation in Somerset County, Maine